Saïd Bouziri, born June 4, 1947 in Tunis, died June 23, 2009 in Paris, accountant by profession, was a human rights activist who was involved in several struggles related to immigration.

Biography 
The eldest of a family of merchants, Saïd Bouziri moved to France in 1966 as part of his studies. He studied in Lyon then in Paris. He joined a Maoist group for a while but quickly became convinced that immigrants should retain their political sovereignty and therefore found their own structures. This is what pushed him, in the context of the Six Day War of 1967 and May 68 to participate in the founding of the Palestine Committee which will become the Arab Workers' Movement in 1973. He also founded the Committee for the Defense of life and rights of immigrant workers.

In 1972, as part of the Marcellin-Fontanet circular, an expulsion order targeted him, as well as his wife, because of his activities. He then started a hunger strike to assert his rights which had a great impact. He was supported by various personalities including Jean-Paul Sartre, Claude Mauriac and Michel Foucault. A demonstration of support brought together more than 2,000 people and ended up winning the case.

Anchored in the Goutte-d'Or district, he founded a socio-cultural center on Stephenson Street and Radio Soleil Goutte-d'Or in 1981. He participated in several movements for the defense of undocumented migrants.

Following the movement he participated in the organization of the March for Equality and Against Racism in 1983.Together with Driss el-Yazami he created the Generic association with for the purpose of preserving the history of immigration. He is also a national treasure of Human Rights League (France) -LDH, for founding a structure in order to allow foreigners to vote in local elections.

References

Tunisian activists
Human Rights League (France) members